Harri Tikkanen (born June 2, 1981) is a Finnish professional ice hockey defenceman who currently plays professionally for Fehérvár AV19 in the Austrian Hockey League (EBEL).

While playing in his native Finland for Lukko of the SM-liiga, Tikkanen won the Matti Keinonen trophy as SM-liiga plus/minus leader in 2009–10 season.

References

External links

1981 births
Living people
Fehérvár AV19 players
Finnish ice hockey defencemen
HPK players
KHL Medveščak Zagreb players
KooKoo players
Lukko players
SaiPa players
HC TPS players
People from Lappeenranta
Sportspeople from South Karelia